Amaranthus graecizans, the Mediterranean amaranth or short-tepalled pigweed, is an annual species in the botanical family Amaranthaceae. It is native to Africa, southern Europe, East Asia to India and Central Asia. It is naturalized in North America.  More general common names include tumbleweed and pigweed.

Characteristics
Stems are branched from base, glabrous or covered with crisped hairs. The flowers are unisexual and are yellow with round black seeds that are 1–1.25 mm.

Habitat
It grows rapidly after rain and can be found in on disturbed ground in the vicinity of human and livestock settlements as well as seasonally flooded sandy flats.

Uses
The edible leaves are used as a vegetable throughout Africa and the Middle East.  It can be eaten raw, but was more often cooked, or added to sauces and stews.  A common way to cook Amaranthus graecizans was to cook it in buttermilk, or to squeeze fresh lime-juice over it.  The seeds are starchy and can also be eaten

No members of this genus are known to be poisonous, but when grown on nitrogen-rich soils they are known to concentrate nitrates in the leaves. This is especially noticeable on land where nitrate fertilizer is used.

References

External links
 PROTAbase on Amaranthus graecizans
 

graecizans
Tumbleweeds
Plants described in 1753
Taxa named by Carl Linnaeus
Leaf vegetables
Flora of Malta